Hydrogen phosphate may refer to 
Monohydrogen phosphate, inorganic ion with the formula [HPO4]2−
Dihydrogen phosphate, inorganic ion with the formula [H2PO4]−
 Potassium hydrogen phosphate
 Sodium hydrogen phosphate

See also
Phosphate